Ihsan Rustem is a British choreographer living in Switzerland

Early career 

Ihsan Rustem was a student at the Thomas Tallis School in his hometown of London before commencing his formal dance training at the Rambert School of Ballet and Contemporary Dance, becoming a member of the National Youth Dance Company from 1997–1999. The following year, at the age of 17, Rustem was invited by Matthew Bourne to join his Adventures in Motion Pictures for the creation of ‘The Car Man’. From 2001–2004 he was a soloist with Philip Taylor's Ballett Theater München (Staatstheater am Gärtnerplatz) before moving to the Netherlands, where he danced for three seasons as a member of Introdans.
 
Since 2007 Rustem has lived and worked in Switzerland, initially as a soloist with Cathy Marston's Stadttheater Bern Ballet, then at the Tanz Luzerner Theater.

Rustem has worked with such well-known choreographers as Mats Ek, Jiri Kylian, Paul Lightfoot / Sol Leon, Hans van Manen. He originated roles in creations by Karole Armitage, Matthew Bourne, Alexander Ekman, Wayne McGregor, Hofesh Shechter, Stijn Celis, Cayetano Soto, Ken Ossola, Georg Reischl and danced further works by Maurice Béjart, William Forsythe, David Parsons and Twyla Tharp, amongst others.
He works extensively with and regularly assists the choreographer Patrick Delcroix.

In 2014 he left the theatre to focus his attention to choreography.

Choreographer 
Rustem was encouraged to choreograph whilst at the Rambert School, creating 10 pieces for the academy. His work 'Twist of Fate', made for the Bern Ballet's 'Dance: Made in Bern' series, was nominated for the 24th International Choreographic Competition Hannover in Hanover, Germany, and for the 2010 Sadler's Wells Global Dance Competition, becoming a finalist in the competitions. The following year he went on to win both the Sadler's Wells Theatre's Global Dance Contest and the Audience Choice Award ('Publikumspreis') at the 25th International Competition for Choreographers in Hannover

He was the 2014 recipient of Hubbard Street Dance Chicago's International Commissioning Project and in 2017 Ihsan's production of Carmen, created for the NW Dance Project, won Dance Magazine's 2017 Readers' Choice Award for Best Collaboration.

Rustem is the Resident Choreographer for the Northwest Dance Project.

He is the former Artistic Director of the Dance Art Studio Ballettschule Luzern and currently serves as their Artistic Advisor.

Creations 

To date, Rustem has created works for Les Ballets Jazz de Montréal, Hubbard Street Dance Chicago, Northwest Dance Project (USA), Istanbul State Ballet MDT (Turkey), Tanz Luzerner Theater, Würzburg Ballett (DE), Kazan State Opera and Ballet (RU), Koblenz Ballet (DE), National Youth Dance Company (UK), Aksanat Istanbul, Cinevox Junior Company (CH), BYU Contemporary Dance Theater (USA), BYU Theatre Ballet (USA), Interdans (BE), Palucca School of Dance (DE), ArtEz Dansacademie Arnhem (Highschool for the Arts Arnhem, NL), ZHdK – Zurich University of the Arts, Codarts (NL), Introdans (NL) and the Dance Art Studio Luzern.

His work Reminiscence appeared on Russia's popular TV competition, The Bolshoi Ballet, where Rustem was a featured choreographer.

Awards 

 Dance Magazine's 2017 Readers' Choice Award for 'Carmen' – Best Collaboration
 Sadler's Wells Theatre's Global Dance Contest 2011 Winner
 2011 Audience Choice Award Hannover International Choreography Competition
 Hubbard Street Dance Chicago's International Commissioning Project winner 2014
 Fewster Cecchetti Scholarship 2nd Prize 2000

Press 
 "Bright and witty…rescued from the graveyard of pop-culture banality and restored affectionately to its pedestal of seductively oddball expressionism" – Oregon Arts Watch on Bolero
 "Ihsan Rustem’s "The Road to Here" is a veritable powerhouse" – Seattle Times
 "The most memorable sequence was choreographed by London-born Ihsan Rustem in his duet to 'Suzanne'" – Boston Globe
 "Rustem’s creations of such graceful energies were much appreciated by everyone" – Calgary Herald
 "NW Dance jumps from great to even better: The addition of choreographer Ihsan Rustem raises the standard" – Phil Busse
 "It’s hard to look away from such breathless abandon." – Oregon Arts Watch on Yidam
 "Rustem has worked for companies around the world; lucky for us that [Olivier] Wevers has brought him to Seattle twice (so far)." – Marcie Cillman
 "Rustem's "Mother Tongue" seems a model of contemporary choreography—a piece very much of its own time but also fiercely focused and sure of itself. It doesn't meander, it doesn't settle for the first idea. Like all good dances, it cuts through space with a conviction that this is the only possible way this particular piece could be." – Bob Hicks

References

External links
 Website Ihsan Rustem
 YouTube page for Ihsan Rustem
 Hannover Choreography Competition
 Sadler's Wells Global Dance Contest 
 Luzerner Theater
 IMDb.com entry

English choreographers
Living people
British male ballet dancers
1982 births